Message in a Haunted Mansion is the third installment in the Nancy Drew point-and-click adventure game series by Her Interactive. The game is available for play on Microsoft Windows platforms as well as Game Boy Advance. It has an ESRB rating of E for moments of mild violence and peril. Players take on the first-person view of fictional amateur sleuth Nancy Drew and must solve the mystery through interrogation of suspects, solving puzzles, and discovering clues. There are two levels of gameplay: Junior and Senior detective modes. Each mode offers a different difficulty level of puzzles and hints, but none of these changes affect the actual plot of the game. The game is loosely based on a book entitled The Message in the Haunted Mansion (1995).

Message in a Haunted Mansion was a commercial success, with sales of 300,000 units and revenues of $5.5 million in the United States alone by August 2006. At the time, Edge named it the country's 64th-best-selling computer game of the 21st Century.

Plot
Nancy Drew is helping Rose Green, a friend of Nancy's housekeeper Hannah Gruen, with some renovation work in an old Victorian mansion in San Francisco that she is converting into a bed and breakfast. But, there are other uninvited guests, visitors from the past—spirits who want the place all to themselves. Strange accidents are slowing down the renovation, and Nancy is trying to figure out who, or what, is trying to scare everyone away.  Nancy suspects that there is another force at work: greed.

Characters

Characters
Nancy Drew - Nancy is an 18-year-old amateur detective from the fictional town of River Heights in the United States. She is the only playable character in the game, which means the player must solve the mystery from her perspective.
Rose Green - Rose is a friend of Hannah Gruen's who invited Nancy out to San Francisco to help her with some renovation work on her Victorian mansion. She plans to open a bed and breakfast with her friend Abby. However, several accidents have caused her to worry about being able to open on time. She's invested her entire life savings into the mansion, but is she reconsidering this venture? If so, how far will she go to regain her money?
Abby Sideris - Abby is a close friend of Rose and co-owner of the mansion. When Rose's bid on the mansion was too low, Abby pitched in her savings to help her purchase it. Abby has a fascination with the supernatural. She believes that the mansion is truly haunted and that the accidents are being caused by restless spirits. She thinks advertising the mansion as haunted and holding traditional séances for the guests staying at the mansion will bring in much business. Could she be faking these hauntings to bring in guests? Is she also somehow involved in these so-called accidents?
Charlie Murphy - Charlie is a young man who is helping Rose with renovations on the mansion. He recently moved to San Francisco from Iowa and studies history at the local community college. Charlie is inexperienced as a handyman and gets very uncomfortable when the accidents are brought up in conversation. He seems friendly and sincerely nice, but could it all be an act?
Louis Chandler - Louis is a suave, middle-aged antique dealer who owns Chandler Interiors and specializes in antiques of the Victorian Period. Rose lets Louis use the library for research in exchange for his services as a consultant on choosing authentic décor for the mansion. He claims to not know anything about the mansion, but is he lying? Could he be the one causing these accidents so he can have Rose sell the mansion to someone else?

Cast
Nancy Drew — Lani Minella
Rose Green — Janis Page
Abby Sideris — Valerie Mosley
Charlie Murphy — Scott Carty
Louis Chandler — Brian Hargus
Hannah Gruen — Maia McCarthy
Emily Foxworth — Shannon Kipp
Bess Marvin — Katie Denny
George Fayne — Lindsey Newman

Reception

Sales
According to PC Data, Message in a Haunted Mansion sold 97,257 units in North America during 2001, and another 20,717 units in the first three months of 2002. Its sales in the region for the year 2003 totaled 44,826 units. The series as a whole sold 1.5 million units by 2004. By August 2006, Message in a Haunted Mansions PC version had sold 300,000 copies and earned $5.5 million in the United States alone. This led Edge to rank it as the country's 64th-best-selling computer game of the 21st Century in August 2006. During the same timeframe, Nancy Drew computer games as a whole totaled sales of 2.1 million units in the United States. Remarking upon this success, Edge declared Nancy Drew a "powerful franchise".

Reviews

The PC version received "favorable" reviews, while the Game Boy Advance version received "mixed" reviews, according to the review aggregation website GameRankings. In The New York Times, writer Charles Herold praised the PC version and noted that "the puzzle design is as good or better than most adult-oriented adventure games."

Message in a Haunted Mansion received a "Gold" Parents' Choice Award in fall 2000. It was also a finalist for The Electric Playgrounds 2001 "Best Adventure Game for PC" award, but lost this prize to Myst III: Exile.

References

External links
New Straits Times
Pittsburgh Post Gazette

2000 video games
Detective video games
Game Boy Advance games
Her Interactive games
North America-exclusive video games
Point-and-click adventure games
Single-player video games
Video games based on Nancy Drew
Video games developed in the United States
Video games scored by Kevin Manthei
Video games set in San Francisco
Windows games